The Modern Art (sometimes spelled Mødern Art) was a psychedelic rock band formed by Gary Ramon in the 1980s.  It had a loose lineup that never played gigs but did see the release of two studio albums and a number of self-produced cassettes. Ramon disbanded the group out of a desire "to make a more live-sounding group that could go out and play".  Many Modern Art members subsequently joined Ramon in various incarnations of his new band, Sun Dial.

Discography

Albums
Underwater Kites (Color Records, October 1982)
Oriental Towers (Color Records, 31 July 1983)
Dimension of Noise
Living in The Distortion Parade
Souvenir
Pastel Sunrise
Modern Artefact No. 1
Modern Artefact No. 2
Guitars on Fire
Collectors Item
Full Tilt At The Chocolate Factory
Stereoland (Color Records, 1987)
All Aboard the Mind Train (OOD, 1989; Acme Records, 1995; Gallium Arsenide, 1994)

Some cassette albums on Color were distributed or re-released by Falling A Records.

Singles
"Dreams to Live" / "Beautiful Truth" (7", Color Records, 1985)
"Penny Valentine" / "One Way Ticket" (7", Color Records, 1988)

Videos
Dimension of Noise

External links
AllMusic biography

British psychedelic rock music groups
Musical groups established in the 1980s